Grenada competed at the 2017 World Championships in Athletics in London, United Kingdom, from 4–13 August 2017.

Results

Men
Field events

Combined events – Decathlon

References

Nations at the 2017 World Championships in Athletics
World Championships in Athletics
Grenada at the World Championships in Athletics